Wieke Elisabeth Henriëtte Dijkstra (born 19 June 1984) is a Dutch field hockey player, who plays as midfielder for Dutch club Laren.

Dijkstra was born in Amsterdam, North Holland. In addition to her club career, she plays for the Netherlands national team, most of the time as a defender. She was part of the Dutch squad that became world champions at the 2006 Women's Hockey World Cup and which won the 2007 Champions Trophy. She recently played her 70th official international match during the 2008 Beijing Olympics final.

At the 2008 Summer Olympics in Beijing she won an Olympic gold medal with the Dutch national team beating China in the final 2–0.

References
sports-reference

External links
 

1984 births
Living people
Dutch female field hockey players
Olympic field hockey players of the Netherlands
Olympic gold medalists for the Netherlands
Olympic medalists in field hockey
Field hockey players at the 2008 Summer Olympics
Medalists at the 2008 Summer Olympics
Field hockey players from Amsterdam
20th-century Dutch women
21st-century Dutch women